Amir Rathaur-Bageria (born 25 October 2000) is a Canadian actor who began his career as a child actor. He is known for his television roles in Degrassi: Next Class and Grand Army.

Life and career
Bageria is from Mississauga, Ontario and is of Indian descent. He attended Rick Hansen Secondary School in Mississauga. His mother, Parmjit Rathaur, is a psychotherapist and his older brother, Kabir, is a cruise director. Amir began acting in local productions from a young age, starting with a family friendly adaption of Macbeth when he was in the third grade. He was one of the youngest actors on Degrassi: Next Class, landing the main role of Baaz Nahir when he was 14. In 2019, he was cast as Siddhartha "Sid" Pakam in the 2020 Netflix series Grand Army.

Filmography

References

External links

Living people
2000 births
Canadian male television actors
Canadian people of Indian descent
Male actors from Ontario
People from Mississauga
Canadian male actors of Indian descent